Oklahoma's 1st congressional district is in the northeastern corner of the state and borders Kansas. Anchored by Tulsa, it is largely coextensive with the Tulsa metropolitan area.  It includes all of Tulsa, Washington and Wagoner counties, and parts of Rogers and Creek counties. Although it has long been reckoned as the Tulsa district, a small portion of Tulsa itself is located in the 3rd district.

Principal cities in the district (other than Tulsa) include Bartlesville, Broken Arrow, Bixby, Jenks, Owasso, Sand Springs, and Wagoner.

The district is currently represented by Republican Kevin Hern who defeated Democratic nominee Tim Gilpin to replace Jim Bridenstine, who resigned to become NASA Administrator in 2018.

Demographics
According to U.S. Census data as of 2010, whites alone make up 67.1% of the population, African Americans 9.0%, Native Americans at 6.6%, Hispanics at 9.8%, Asians at 2.1 and other races at 5.4%.

Results from recent statewide elections

History
The district was the only congressional district represented by a Republican upon statehood. For much of the district's history, it has shifted back and forth between the two political parties.  However, it has leaned increasingly Republican since the second half of the 20th century.  Since 1945, only one Democrat has served more than one term in the district.  It has been in Republican hands without interruption since 1987.  Mitt Romney received 66 percent of the vote in this district in 2012.

Oklahoma's longest serving Senator, Jim Inhofe, represented this district from 1987 to 1994.  His four successors, Steve Largent, John Sullivan, Jim Bridenstine, and Kevin Hern have all been Republicans.

List of members representing the district

Recent election results

2012

2014
Bridenstine ran unopposed for re-election.

2016
Bridenstine ran unopposed for re-election.

2018

2020

2022

Historical district boundaries

See also

Oklahoma's congressional districts
List of United States congressional districts

References

 Congressional Biographical Directory of the United States 1774–present

01